Henry John Neville Vane, 11th Baron Barnard,  (21 September 1923 – 3 April 2016) was an English peer and landowner in Northumbria and County Durham.

Life
Born at Raby Castle in County Durham, the son of Christopher Vane, 10th Baron Barnard, the young Vane was educated at Eton College. On leaving school in 1942 he joined the Royal Air Force Volunteer Reserve, training in South Africa, although he would never see combat. In the aftermath of the war he was commissioned into the Northumberland Hussars. From 1952 to 1961, as Henry Vane he was a county councillor for County Durham and also, from 1956 to 1970, a Deputy Lieutenant of Durham.

In 1960, Vane was awarded the Territorial Decoration, and in 1961 he became a Justice of the Peace for County Durham.

In 1964, on his father's death, he succeeded him as Baron Barnard, with a seat in the House of Lords, and inherited an estate of some 60,000 acres. 

He was Lieutenant-Colonel of the Northumberland Hussars between 1964 and 1966, Lord Lieutenant of Durham between 1970 and 1988, and Honorary Colonel of the 7th (Durham) Battalion, Light Infantry between 1979 and 1989.

At the age of 63, Lord Barnard, who had missed his university years in his youth because of the war, surprised friends by enrolling at Durham University Business School and taking an MSc in Management Studies.

He was initiated into freemasonry in Agricola Lodge No.7741 in 1961.  He served as Provincial Grand Master of the Provincial Grand Lodge of Durham from December 1969 until January 1998, and served as Senior Grand Warden of the United Grand Lodge of England in 1970–1971.

On his death in 2016, he left an estate valued at £94 million.

Family
He married Lady Davina Mary Cecil (1931-2018), daughter of David Cecil, 6th Marquess of Exeter on 8 October 1952 at St Margaret's, Westminster. They were divorced in 1992. They had five children; Henry, who succeeded as 12th Baron Barnard, and four daughters.

Lady Barnard retired to Barningham, where she died in 2018.

References

Burke's Peerage
Who's Who 2009

1923 births
2016 deaths
Military personnel from County Durham 
Alumni of Durham University
Deputy Lieutenants of Durham
English justices of the peace
Lord-Lieutenants of Durham
Northumberland Hussars officers
People educated at Eton College
Royal Air Force officers
John
Barons Barnard
Royal Air Force Volunteer Reserve personnel of World War II

Barnard